Pacelli High School is a private secondary school located on the north side of Stevens Point, Wisconsin in the Roman Catholic Diocese of La Crosse. The school, named in honor of Pope Pius XII, was founded in 1955 by Institute of the Brothers of the Christian Schools (Christian Brothers).

History
Originally an all-boys high school, Pacelli merged with the all-girls Maria High School in the early 1970s to create a co-ed school offering a college-prep curriculum.  The school is currently housed in the former Maria High School building.  The former Pacelli building on Division Street is now home to the local YMCA.  Pacelli High School became part of the Pacelli Catholic Schools system (called Stevens Point Area Catholic Schools until 2015) when consolidation of all the Catholic schools took place in 1986.

Notable alumni 
 William A. Bablitch (1959), associate justice, Wisconsin Supreme Court, retired
 David Helbach, politician
 Brad Soderberg (1980), former head coach men's basketball University of Wisconsin and Saint Louis University
 Abbie Betinis (1997), composer
 Ben Kissel, podcast host (Last Podcast on the Left)

References

External links 
 
 Stevens Point Area Catholic Schools

Roman Catholic Diocese of La Crosse
Stevens Point, Wisconsin
Lasallian schools in the United States
Catholic secondary schools in Wisconsin
Educational institutions established in 1955
Schools in Portage County, Wisconsin
1955 establishments in Wisconsin